Félix Cottrau (1799 in Paris – 1852 in Paris), was a French painter. He painted landscapes, portraits, Scriptural, and fancy subjects.

References
 

1799 births
1852 deaths
French landscape painters
French portrait painters
Painters from Paris